Sylvania "Sly" Watkins (born February 18, 1985) is an American professional basketball player who currently plays for the Moncton Miracles of the National Basketball League of Canada (NBL). He played college basketball at Okaloosa–Walton Community College and then Crichton College. Watkins also competed at the high school level with South Atlanta High School in his hometown,  Atlanta, Georgia. As a professional, he has spent much of his years with the Miracles, seeing success primarily on the defensive end.

High school career 
Watkins attended South Atlanta High School in Atlanta, Georgia and played varsity basketball for four years. In his junior year, he led his team to a 27–3 record and earned All-State honorable mention, first-team all-region, and first-team all-city honors. As a senior, Watkins averaged 12.5 points, 13.0 rebounds and 4.5 blocks and earned the same honors as he did the previous year. South Atlanta ended the season with a 30–2 mark and a berth at the 4A state championship game.

Collegiate career 
As a freshman, Watkins played college basketball at Okaloosa–Walton Community College in Niceville, Florida, averaging 8.2 points and 7.2 rebounds per game. The Raiders finished their season with a 21–9 record, second place in the Panhandle Conference, and berths to the state and NJCAA tournaments.

In November 2004, Watkins signed a National Letter of Intent (NLI) to play with the NCAA Division I program at Western Kentucky for the following season. Hilltoppers head coach Darrin Horn praised him for his style of play and expected him to become a significant part of the team's front line. However, Watkins later decided to not enroll at WKU due to personal reasons.

Watkins competed with Crichton College in Memphis, Tennessee for the 2006–07 season. In his debut, he posted a double-double of 19 points and 10 rebounds against Philander Smith College. On November 21, 2006, he was named TranSouth Athletic Conference Player of the Week in men's basketball after leading Crichton to two wins to start off the season. He was averaging 23.0 points, 7.5 rebounds, 2.0 assists, 2.5 blocks, and 1.5 steals that week. At the end of the season, Watkins led the Comets to an Elite Eight appearance at the NAIA tournament. His team also won the TranSouth tournament and Watkins was named first-team all-conference.

Professional career 
In 2009, Watkins took part in the Southeastern Exposure Basketball League (SEBL) for Rome Servpro-1. He later joined the Georgia Gwizzlies of the American Basketball Association (ABA) for the 2010–11 season. Following his stint with the Gwizzlies, Watkins competed at the Kentuckiana Pro–Am summer league with Team Atlanta. In 2011, Watkins returned to the ABA and signed with the Atlanta Experience. However, he left the team in December, when he signed with the Moncton Miracles of the newly-created National Basketball League of Canada (NBL).

References

External links 
 Sylvania Watkins at Eurobasket.com 

1985 births
Living people
American expatriate basketball people in Canada
American men's basketball players
Basketball players from Atlanta
Centers (basketball)
Moncton Miracles players
Northwest Florida State Raiders men's basketball players
Power forwards (basketball)
Victory University alumni
Western Kentucky Hilltoppers basketball players